Dascilloidea is a superfamily of polyphagan beetles, comprising two families: Dascillidae (soft bodied plant beetles) and Rhipiceridae (cicada beetle and cicada parasite beetles).

References

Elateriformia
Beetle superfamilies
Taxa named by Félix Édouard Guérin-Méneville